Chigozie Stephanie Alichi (born 23 December 1993), popularly known as Chizzy Alichi, is a Nigerian film actress.

Life 
Alichi is from Ezza Nkwubor Nike in Enugu East, a local government area of Enugu State, located in South East (Nigeria). She is the last child with two siblings. She made headlines when she built a mansion for her parents in 2017. She lives in Asaba, Delta.

Her parents are Mr and Mrs Alexander Alichi. Chizzy is currently married Chike Ugochukwu Mbah, The couple got married in December 2019, and the wedding was primarily attended by celebrities like Patience Ozokwor and many others.

Education 
She holds a bachelor's degree in agriculture engineering from Enugu State University of Science and Technology.

Career 
She joined Nollywood in 2010 by chance. She randomly joined the Actors Guild of Nigeria, applied for a movie role and got her first ever shot as an actress in a movie titled Magic Money featuring Mercy Johnson and Bob-Manuel Udokwu. The turning point of her career came with the movie Akaraoku, which means "hot akara", in 2016, Directed by Yul Edochie. The movie poster went viral on social media when people assumed the actress was an akara seller. She has featured in more movies as a result in 2017.

Song appearances

Awards

Selected filmography

References

External links
 
 Chizzy Alichi official website

Living people
Igbo television personalities
1993 births
Igbo actresses
21st-century Nigerian actresses
Actresses from Enugu State
Nigerian television personalities
Nigerian female models